"Cupid Shuffle" is a song by Cupid from his 2007 studio album Time for a Change. It has spawned a popular line dance and has drawn comparisons to DJ Casper's "Cha Cha Slide".

In the United States, the song peaked at number 66 on the Billboard Hot 100 and number 21 on the Hot R&B/Hip-Hop Songs the chart, both in the August 18, 2007 issue.

The Voice
In 2012, Cupid chose the song for his audition to the third season of the American music competition show The Voice, broadcast on NBC. Although he gave a different version of the hit, none of the four judges pressed their "I Want You" button and he was automatically eliminated from further competition in the show. But after turning their chairs, judge Cee Lo Green recognized Cupid and asked him to perform another song to prove that "he can sing".

In popular culture

The song and dance are featured in a scene at the end of the film Jumping the Broom. 
In Week 5 of the 2008 NFL season, three Miami Dolphins, including running back Ronnie Brown, used the "Cupid Shuffle" dance as a celebratory dance after scoring a touchdown against the San Diego Chargers. The three were later fined as the celebration was deemed premeditated.
This song appears in Dance Central 3.
This song was used in the Philippine talent search Protégé: The Battle for the Big Artista Break in 2012.
The song appears in a party scene in season one, episode three of Ginny and Georgia.
"Cupid Shuffle" was a defining aspect of the early 2010s due to its meteoric popularity as an avant-garde exercise technique for elementary schools and bowling alleys, similar to DJ Casper's "Cha Cha Slide". When used at school dances, proms, weddings or other festive occasions, "Cupid Shuffle" and "Cha Cha Slide" are often played one right after the other.

Charts and certifications

Weekly charts

Year-end charts

Certifications

References

External links
Cupid's official website
Cupid's MySpace page
Cupid Shuffle is a selected dance at the CWDC 2010 European Line Dance Championships

2007 songs
2007 singles
Cupid (singer) songs
Atlantic Records singles
Line dances
Novelty and fad dances
Songs about dancing
Songs about musicians
Hip hop dance